Hidden Man is a 2018 Chinese action comedy film co-written and directed by Jiang Wen and starring Eddie Peng, Liao Fan, Jiang Wen, Zhou Yun, and Xu Qing. The film is an adaptation of Zhang Beihai's wuxia novel Xia Yin. The film was released on July 13, 2018, in China. It was selected as the Chinese entry for the Best Foreign Language Film at the 91st Academy Awards, but it was not nominated.

Cast

Production
Wuxi Zizai Film and Television Company Limited bought the film rights to the wuxia novel Xia Yin written by Zhang Beihai.

The film became the third in a series, with two prequels, Let the Bullets Fly (2010) and Gone with the Bullets (2014).

Filming locations included Xi'an, Beijing, and Yunnan.

American actor Kevin Spacey was supposed to appear in a scene, but this was cut after Spacey's sexual assault allegations came to light.

Release
On May 15, 2018, the producers announced that the film was scheduled for release on July 13, 2018. The film premiered in Beijing on July 10 with wide-release in China on July 13. The film earned $17.9 million on opening day, totaling $46.5 million after three days.

Awards and nominations

See also
 List of submissions to the 91st Academy Awards for Best Foreign Language Film
 List of Chinese submissions for the Academy Award for Best Foreign Language Film

References

External links
 
 
 

2018 films
2010s Mandarin-language films
2018 action comedy films
Chinese action comedy films
Films directed by Jiang Wen
Films shot in Beijing
Films shot in Shaanxi
Films shot in Yunnan
Films based on Chinese novels
Second Sino-Japanese War films